Vífill is the name of different minor characters who appear in several Old Norse sources:

Þorsteins saga Víkingssonar (the paternal grandfather of the protagonist in the story)
Hrólfs saga kraka ok kappa hans (saves the lives of young Hroðgar and his brother Halga)
Landnámabók
Kálfsvísa (appears to be one of king Onela's warriors, and a comrade of Weohstan)
Eiríks saga rauða
Hálfs saga ok Hálfsrekka
Orvar-Odd's saga (mentioned in Hjalmar's death song)

Legendary Norsemen